The Marrying Man (known as Too Hot to Handle in the United Kingdom, Australia, and the Philippines) is a 1991 American romantic comedy film, directed by Jerry Rees, written by Neil Simon, and starring Alec Baldwin and Kim Basinger. The film opened to poor reviews and did not break out at the box office, with Basinger's performance earning her a Golden Raspberry Award nomination for Worst Actress, where she lost to Sean Young for A Kiss Before Dying.

Plot
Charley Pearl is the heir to a toothpaste empire's fortune. He is a playboy who does not work, spending his time indulging in hobbies like speedboats and fast cars. Charley is engaged to Adele, the daughter of Lew Horner, a foul-mouthed, hot-tempered Hollywood studio mogul. Horner is concerned that Charley has no ambition and no apparent guilt about it.

His four best friends accompany Charley on a drive to Las Vegas for a bachelor's fling. Charley is willing to foot the bill for Phil, Sammy, Tony, and George but is eager to get back home to his fiancee. They make a quick stop for a drink at a nightclub where Vicki Anderson, a glamorous singer, disrupts Charley's thoughts of wedded bliss. He tries to pick up Vicki after her performance but is warned that she belongs to somebody else. Vicki responds to Charley's charm, however, and offers to leave a window open at her home. Charley shows up and they end up in bed, only to be caught by her other lover — Bugsy Siegel, the notorious Jewish-American organized crime figure and hitman.

Bugsy amuses himself with the notion that he will take the scared-stiff Vicki and Charley to a justice of the peace in the middle of the night and make them marry one another. Charley drives her back to California and offers to pay her expenses, but Vicki walks out. In the meantime, their wedding photo pops up on the front page of the morning newspaper—with Charley's engagement announcement to Lew Horner's daughter appearing on a later page. Charley apologizes and still wants to marry Adele. He agrees to get an annulment from Vicki and to pay a considerable sum to charity if he should dare disappoint Horner's daughter again.

Charley runs into Vicki again and can not help himself. Charley remarries Vicki, again leaving his fiancee in the lurch. Lew Horner stops just short of killing Charley, instead sending a couple of thugs to beat him and toss him into a swimming pool. Vicki is happy, too, momentarily, coming home with an offer that could advance her career, only to learn that Charley's father has died and he is needed in Boston, where he is expected to run the family's business.

Vicki puts her career on hold and spends two years in Boston, enduring high society and boring tea parties. She can not wait to get back to California and her career, but when Charley reneges on his promise, Vicki gets a divorce. Charley and his friends track Vicki to a nightclub where she has taken up with another shady figure. They become involved in a violent brawl. Charley then makes off with Vicki and marries her a third time. As a gesture of gratitude, Charley sinks millions of dollars into a movie studio where he intends to produce pictures featuring his wife. But while the careers of his buddies take off, Charley and Vicki begin to have children. Nothing at the new studio gets under way, and Charley goes broke, blaming Vicki, who walks out on him yet again.

Divorced and depressed, Charley is found by his friends quite a bit later at a nightclub, where he tells them he has recently gone into a promising new line of work: computers. He stares dreamily at the stage where Vicki is performing her act. Charley shows his friends a diamond engagement ring that he has brought with him. Vicki slides it onto her finger.

Cast
Alec Baldwin as Charley Pearl
Kim Basinger as Vicki Anderson
Robert Loggia as Lew Horner
Elisabeth Shue as Adele Horner
Armand Assante as Bugsy Siegel
Paul Reiser as Phil
Fisher Stevens as Sammy
Steve Hytner as George
Kristen Cloke as Louise
Peter Dobson as Tony
Kathryn Layng as Emma
Jeremy Roberts as Gus
Big John Studd as Dante

Production
A blistering pair of articles appeared in Premiere magazine ahead of the film's release detailing a "production from hell" and painting Baldwin and Basinger as petulant, spoiled and generally unprofessional. According to the reports, Baldwin and Basinger fell in love themselves at the beginning of the shoot and sometimes kept the entire crew waiting around for hours before showing up on set. Baldwin threw violent temper tantrums during which he tossed a chair, smashed camera lenses, punched a dent in his trailer and swore at crew members, while Basinger refused to do extra takes, demanded constant delays to fix her hair and caused Neil Simon to storm off the set after she said to him one day, "This isn't funny. Whoever wrote this doesn't understand comedy." The production difficulties caused the budget to balloon from $15 million to $26 million. When the production was over, producer David Permut presented each member of the crew with a T-shirt emblazoned with the phrase, "I survived the reshoot of 'The Marrying Man.'"

Reception
The Marrying Man was panned by critics, as the film holds a 10% rating on Rotten Tomatoes, based on 21 reviews. Audiences surveyed by CinemaScore gave the film a grade of "B" on scale of A+ to F.

Vincent Canby of The New York Times described the film as "a bore. Mr. Baldwin and Miss Basinger are attractive players, but their comic potential remains unexplored here. Even when they're having steamy sex on the screen, very little of the excitement is shared by the audience." Roger Ebert gave the film three stars out of four and likened it to "those lightweight, atmospheric comedies of the postwar era, in which the chemistry between the stars covered up for a certain lack of logic, continuity and polish. The movie has rough edges and a slapdash air about it, but somehow it works, perhaps because Basinger and Baldwin throw themselves with such abandon into their roles." Dave Kehr of the Chicago Tribune gave the film one star out of four and stated, "Uniting a collection of characters that seem to belong to no known universe and an array of artificial plot devices that only a desperate screenwriter (in this case, Neil Simon) could love, 'The Marrying Man' never gathers the slightest conviction or credibility." Variety panned the film as "a stillborn romantic comedy of staggering ineptitude." Peter Rainer of the Los Angeles Times wrote that the film had "a terrific comic premise" but that Baldwin and Basinger "don't really make for a great match, and given the film's premise, that's a fatal problem. The crazy lust that would make these two keep going at each other year after year and marriage after marriage just isn't on the screen." Peter Travers of Rolling Stone described the film as "conspicuously mediocre" and suggested, "Somebody should have made a movie of the [Premiere] article, since all the fireworks were off camera."

Shortly after the film's release, Baldwin called it "the biggest mistake of my career."

References

External links

1991 films
1991 romantic comedy films
American romantic comedy films
Films directed by Jerry Rees
Films scored by David Newman
Films set in 1956
Films set in San Francisco
Films with screenplays by Neil Simon
Hollywood Pictures films
1990s English-language films
1990s American films